Zuleika is a given name for females. Spelling variations include Zuleikha, Zuleyka, Zuleica and Zuleykha. The name is of uncertain origin, possibly from Persian, meaning "brilliant beauty", or from Arabic, meaning "bright and fair".

People 
 Zuleika Alambert (1922–2012), Brazilian writer, feminist and politician
 Zuleika Bazhbeuk-Melikyan (born 1939), Armenian painter
 Zuleikha Chaudhuri, Indian 21st-century theatre director
 Zulekha Daud, Indian physician and entrepreneur
 Zuleika Fuentes (born 1993), Puerto Rican handball player
 Zuzu Angel, born Zuleika Angel Jones (1921–1976), Brazilian fashion designer and activist
 Zulaikha Patel (born c. 2002), a South African girl who became a symbol of the fight against school policies about black girls' hair
 Zuleyka Rivera (born 1987), Puerto Rican actress
 Zuleikha Robinson (born 1977), British actress
 Zuleykha Safarova (born 1999), Azerbaijani tennis player
 Zuleykha Seyidmammadova (1919–1999), one of the first Azerbaijan female pilots and the first Azerbaijani woman to fly in combat
 Zuleika Suárez (born 1994), Colombian beauty pageant contestant
 Zuleikha Yunus Haji (born 1956), former Member of Parliament in the National Assembly of Tanzania
 Zuleyka Silver (born 1991), Mexican-American actress and model

Biblical and fictional characters 
 Zuleikha (tradition), Potiphar's wife in Jewish and Muslim tradition
 Zulaikha in Yusuf and Zulaikha, the Islamic version of the story of the prophet Joseph and Potiphar's wife
 Zuleika, heroine of the poem The Bride of Abydos (1813) by Byron
 Zuleika, heroine of the Book of Zuleika in the West–östlicher Divan (1819) by Goethe
 Zulejka, heroine of the narrative poem Sümeg vára (1858) by 
 Title heroine of the 1911 novel Zuleika Dobson by Max Beerbohm
 Title character of Zuleika (musical), a musical based on the novel Zuleika Dobson
 Title heroine of the 2005 Maldivian film Zuleykha
 Title heroine of the 2015 novel Zuleikha by Russian author Guzel Yakhina

See also 
 
 
 Zuleika (disambiguation)

References 

Feminine given names